Rattin may refer to:

 Antonio Rattín (born 1937), Argentine footballer and politician
 Die Rättin, 1986 novel by Günter Grass
 Rattin, a townland near Kinnegad, Country Westmeath, Ireland
 Rattin Castle, a ruined castle

See also
 Ratin, a village in Romania – see Crasna, Sălaj